The La Penthiève Beds is a geologic formation in France. It preserves fossils dating back to the Cretaceous period.

Paleofauna
Crocodylia indet.
Dakosaurus sp.
Erectopus superbus
Hylaeosaurus sp.
Pervushovisaurus campylodon
Plesiosauria indet.
Polycotylus sp.
Polyptychodon interruptus

See also

 List of fossiliferous stratigraphic units in France

References
 

Cretaceous France